Devin is a unisex English-language given name, of many origins. One origin for Devin is from the surname Devin, which is an anglicization of the Irish patronymic Ó Damháin. The Irish patronymic is in reference to the given name 'damán allaid' meaning "fawn", or "poet."

A separate and unrelated root for Devin is from a nickname, based on Old French devin, "divine" (Latin dīvīnus).

As a masculine given name, Devin became somewhat popular in the United States during the 1980s to 2000s, peaking at rank 59 in 1997. During this time, Devin also began to see some use as a feminine given name. Feminine usage peaked in 1991, at rank 238, or 28% of masculine usage.

People called Devin

Men

A-C
 Devin Allen (fl. 2010s–2020s), American photographer, photojournalist, and activist
 Devin Aromashodu (born 1984), American football player
 Devin Asiasi (born 1997), American football player
 Devin Askew (born 2002), American basketball player
 Devin Barclay (born 1983), American soccer and football player
 Devin Battley (born 1950), American businessman and motorcycle racer and dealer
 Devin Beliveau (fl. 2010s), American politician and schoolteacher
 Devin Benton (born 1999), American soccer player
 Devin Booker (born 1996), American basketball player
 Devin Booker (basketball, born 1991), American basketball player
 Devin Bowen (born 1972), American tennis player
 Devin Boyce (born 1996), American soccer player
 Devin Boyd (born 1970), American basketball player
 Devin Britton (born 1991), American tennis player
 Devin Bronson (born 1983), American guitarist, songwriter, and producer
 Devin Brooks (born 1992), American basketball player
 Devin Brown (born 1978), American basketball player
 Devin Bush Sr. (born 1973), American football player
 Devin Bush Jr. (born 1998), American football player
 Devin Caherly (fl. 2010s–2020s), American social media personality and businessperson
 Devin Cannady (born 1996), American basketball player
 Devin Carney (born 1984), American politician
 Devin Clark (American football) (born 1986), American football player
 Devin Clark (fighter) (born 1990), American mixed martial artist
 Devin Cole (born 1976), American mixed martial artist
 Devin Copeland (born 1970), American rapper who uses the stage name Devin the Dude

D-G
 Devin Davis (musician) (fl. 2000s), American indie musician
 Devin Davis (basketball, born 1974), American/Spanish basketball player
 Devin Davis (basketball, born 1995), American basketball player
 Devin Dawson (born 1989), American country music singer and songwriter
 Devin DeHaven (born 1970), American television director and producer
 Devin Del Do (born 1986), American soccer player
 Devin Deweese (born 1956), American professor of Islamic and Central Eurasian Studies in Indiana
 Devin DiDiomete (born 1988), Canadian-born Italian ice hockey player
 Devin Dodson (born 1999), American stock car racing driver
 Devin Dreeshen (born 1987/1988), Canadian politician
 Devin Druid (born 1998), American actor
 Devin Durrant (born 1960), American basketball player
 Devin Duvernay (born 1997), American football player
 Devin Dwyer (born 1982/1983), American digital reporter and television journalist
 Devin Eatmon (fl. 2010s–2020s), American operatic tenor
 Devin Ebanks (born 1989), American basketball player
 Devin Edgerton (born 1970), Canadian ice hockey centre
 Devin Finzer (born 1990), American entrepreneur and technology executive
 Devin Lahardi Fitriawan (born 1983), Indonesian badminton player
 Devin Friedman (fl. 2000s–2010s) American journalist
 Devin Fuller (born 1994), American football player
 Devin Funchess (born 1994), American football player
 Devin Gaines (1984–2007), American college student and drowning victim
 Devin Galligan (1972–2003), American charity founder
 Devin Gardner (born 1991), American football quarterback
 Devin Gibson (born 1987), American music video and film director
 Devin Gibson (basketball) (born 1989), American professional basketball player
 Devin Goda (born 1989), American male model and former football player
 Devin Graham (born 1983), American videographer
 Devin Gray (1972–2013), American basketball player
 Devin Gray (American football) (born 1995), American football wide receiver
 Devin Grayson (fl. 1990s–2020s), American writer of comic books and novels
 Devin Green (born 1982), American basketball player
 Devin Griffin (born 1984), British DJ

H-R
 Devin Haney (born 1998), American boxer
 Devin Harper (born 1998), American football player
 Devin Harris (born 1983), American basketball player
 Devin Hester (born 1982), American football player
 Devin Hoff (fl. 2000s–2020s), American bassist, composer, and arranger
 Devin Holland (born 1988), American football safety
 Devin Jones (born 1994), American professional stock car and sports car racing driver
 Devin LeMahieu (born 1972), American businessman and Republican politician
 Devin Leary (born 1999), American football quarterback
 Devin Lebsack (fl. 2000s–2010s), American drummer
 Devin Lemons (born 1979), American football linebacker
 Devin Lloyd (born 1998), American football linebacker
 Devin Lucien (born 1993), American football player
 Devin McCourty (born 1987), American football player
 Devin McEwan (born 1984), American slalom canoeist
 Devin McGlamery (born 1982), American Christian musician
 Devin Mesoraco (born 1988), American baseball catcher and coach
 Devin Moore (murderer) (born 1985), American convicted murderer
 Devin Moore (American football) (born 1985), American football running back
 Devin Morgan (born 1993), American soccer player
 Devin N. Morris (born 1986), American artist 
 Devin Mullings (born 1985), Bahamian professional tennis player
 Devin E. Naar (fl. 2010s), American Jewish studies scholar
 Devin Nunes (born 1973), American politician
 Devin Oliver (born 1992), American basketball player
 Devin Oosthuizen (born 1988), South African rugby union player
 Devin Pepper (born 1969), U.S. Space Force brigadier general
 Devin Perales (born 1993), American soccer player
 Devin Powell (born 1988), mixed martial arts fighter
 Devin Rask (born 1978), Canadian ice hockey player and coach
 Devin Ratray (born 1977), American actor
 Devin Robinson (born 1995), American basketball player

S-Z
 Devin Sarno (born 1966), American musician
 Devin Scillian (born 1963), American television journalist, musician, and children's author
 Devin Searcy (born 1989), American basketball player
 Devin Setoguchi (born 1987), Canadian hockey player
 Devin Shore (born 1994), Canadian ice hockey forward
 Devin Sibley (born 1996), American basketball player
 Devin Singletary (born 1997), American football player
 Devin Smeltzer (born 1995), American professional baseball pitcher
 Devin Smith (American football) (born 1992), American football player
 Devin Smith (basketball) (born 1983), American player in the Israeli Super League
 Devin J. Stewart (fl. 1980s–2010s), American professor of Islamic studies and Arabic language and literature
 Devin Stone (fl. 2000s–2020s), American lawyer and YouTuber
 Devin Street (born 1991), American football wide receiver
 Devin Sweetney (born 1987), American basketball player
 Devin Talbott (born 1976), American entrepreneur and private investor
 Devin Taylor (American football) (born 1989), American football player
 Devin Taylor (wrestler) (born 1988), American model, actress, television personality, and professional wrestler
 Devin Terhune (fl. 2000s–2020s), English cognitive neuroscientist
 Devin Therriault (born 1988/89), American musician
 Devin Thomas (born 1986), American football player
 Devin Thomas (basketball) (born 1994), American basketball player
 Devin Toner (born 1986), Irish rugby union player
 Devin Townsend (born 1972), Canadian musician, songwriter and record producer
 Devin Tyler (born 1986), American player of both American and Canadian football
 Devin Vargas (born 1981), American boxer
 Devin Vassell (born 2000), American basketball player
 Devin Vega (born 1998), Puerto Rican soccer player
 Devin G. Walker (fl. 2000s–2020s), American theoretical particle physicist
 Devin Wenig (born 1966), American businessman, CEO of eBay
 Devin White (born 1998), American football player
 Devin Williams (baseball) (born 1994), American baseball pitcher
 Devin Williams (basketball) (born 1994), American basketball player
 Devin Wilson (born 1990), indoor football wide receiver
 Devin Wyman (born 1973), American football player

Women 
 Devin Alexander (fl. 2000s–2020s), American chef, author and media personality
 Devin DeVasquez (born 1963), American actress and model
 Devin Kelley (born 1986), American actress
 Devin Logan (born 1993), American freeskier
 Devin Mills (fl. 1980s–2020s), American actress
 Devin Tailes (born 1989), American singer (stage name Dev)
 Devin Taylor (wrestler) (born 1988), American model, actress, television personality, and professional wrestler

Surname
 Bill Devin (1915–2000), American businessperson, automotive entrepreneur and racing driver
 Thomas Devin (1822–1878), American brevet major general
 William A. Devin (1871–1959), American jurist, Associate Justice and Chief Justice of the North Carolina Supreme Court
 William F. Devin (1898–1982), American politician, mayor of Seattle

See also
Devon (given name)
Devon (surname)

Citations

References

English-language unisex given names